The following are official state symbols of the Indian state of Assam.

See also

List of Indian state symbols

References
State symbols of Assam
Assam Forest Policy 2004
List of Assam State symbols

Symbols
Assam state
Government of Assam